Koeneniodes is a genus of Eukoeneniid microwhip scorpions, first described by Filippo Silvestri in 1913.

Species 
, the World Palpigradi Catalog accepts the following eight species:

 Koeneniodes berndi Condé, 1988 – Malaysia
 Koeneniodes deharvengi Condé, 1981 – Philippines
 Koeneniodes frondiger Rémy, 1950 – Indonesia, Madagascar, Mauritius, Papua New Guinea, Réunion
 Koeneniodes leclerci Condé, 1992 – Thailand
 Koeneniodes madecassus Rémy, 1950 – Hong Kong, Indonesia, Madagascar, Mauritius, Réunion, Seychelles, Sri Lanka
 Koeneniodes malagasorum Rémy, 1960 – Madagascar
 Koeneniodes notabilis Silvestri, 1913 – Guinea
 Koeneniodes spiniger Condé, 1984 – Thailand

References 

Palpigradi
Taxa named by Filippo Silvestri